Lucile Saunders McDonald (September 1, 1898 – June 23, 1992) was an American journalist, historian, and author of children's books from the Pacific Northwest. The Seattle Times described her as "... the first woman news reporter in all of South America; first woman copy editor in the Pacific Northwest; first woman telegraph editor, courthouse reporter and general news reporter in Oregon; first woman overseas correspondent for a U.S. trade newspaper; first woman on a New York City rewrite desk; second woman journalist in Alaska; and second woman to be a correspondent abroad for The Associated Press". With Zola Helen Ross, she co-founded the Pacific Northwest Writers Association.

Biography

She was born in Portland, Oregon, in 1898, to baker Frank Saunders and schoolteacher Rose Saunders. She had one sibling, a sister, named Iris McRae. McDonald attended the University of Oregon while working for the Eugene Daily Guard. In her early years, she worked at The Bulletin in Bend, as a reporter and news editor for The Oregonian in Portland, and as wire editor for The Statesman-Journal in Salem. She went on to write for newspapers from Alaska to South America, including the Seattle Daily Times, The New York Times, the United Press International, the Bellevue Journal-American and the Cordova Daily Times. She wrote or co-authored 28 books. McDonald was a member of the Seattle Free Lances, the Authors League of America, Theta Sigma Phi's National Executive Board, and the New York Newspaperwoman's Club.

She married Harold D. McDonald in 1922; they had a son and daughter and moved to Seattle in 1940. They resided in Bellevue and Kirkland, Washington. McDonald was a feature history writer and book reviewer for The Seattle Times from 1940 to 1966 and later wrote 450 history columns for the Journal-American until her retirement in 1987. She was active in several local historical societies, including the Puget Sound Maritime Historical Society. She died on June 23, 1992, in Redmond, Washington. Her autobiography, A foot in the door: the reminiscences of Lucile McDonald, was posthumously published in 1995. McDonald was a 1959 Headliner Awards Recipient from the Association for Women in Communications.

Partial works
Children's books
 Dick and the Spice Cupboard
 Jewels and Gems
 The Giant with Four Arms

Co-authored with Ross
 (1950) The mystery of Castesby Island
 (1952) Stormy year
 (1954) Fridays̓ child
 (1956) Mystery of the long house
 (1956) Pigtail pioneer
 (1957) Wing Harbor
 (1958) The courting of Ann Maria
 (1959) Assignment in Ankara
 (1961) Winter's answer
 (1959) The stolen letters
 (1968) The sunken forest

Non-fiction
 (1953) Washington's Yesterdays
 (1958) Search for the Northwest Passage, Library of Congress CC# 58-11860, Ill.
Published by Binfords & Mort, Portland, OR.
 (1972) Swan Among the Indians, Life of James G. Swan, 1818-1900, Portland, Oregon, Binfords & Mort.

References

External links
 Photo, 1943

1898 births
1992 deaths
20th-century American women writers
Western (genre) writers
American women journalists
University of Oregon alumni
Writers from Portland, Oregon
The Seattle Times people